Merfolk or merpeople are legendary water-dwelling human-like beings. They are attested in folklore and mythology throughout the ages in various parts of the world.

Female merfolk may be referred to as mermaids, although in a strict sense mermaids are confined to beings who are half-woman and half-fish in appearance. Male merfolk are called mermen. Depending on the story, they can be described as ugly or beautiful.

Chinese renyu stands for "merfolk", but in ancient geographical or natural historical tracts, this referred to "human-fish" or "man-fish" purported to inhabit rivers or lakes in certain parts of China. Japanese ningyo is also "merfolk", and also applied to various human-like fish recorded in writings from medieval times into the Edo Period.

China 

Certain fantastical types of "fish", generically referred to as renyu ("human-fish") is alleged to occur in various parts of China according to the Shan Hai Jing (Classic of Mountains and Seas, 4th century BC). It is mentioned in the Bei Shan Jing ("Classic of the Northern mountains"),  Zhong Shan Jing (Central Mountains), and  Xi Shan Jing (Western Mountains) sections of this work.

It is recorded that the Mausoleum of the First Qin Emperor was illuminated with lamps fueled by the oil of the human-fish (renyu), whose flames were meant to last a very long time.

Renyu or human-fish 
(aka haieryu. subtypes tiyu and niyu )

The renyu (human-fish) is described in the Bei Shan Jing ("Classic of the North Mountains") section as dwelling on Mt. Longhou ("Dragon-Marquis Mountain") in the waters of the Jueshui ("Bursting River"), which flows eastward into the Yellow River. It is said to "resemble the tiyu" (translated as "resemble catfish") possess four legs, with a voice like baby crying.

Eating the fish purportedly cured idiocy or dementia. This fish as a cure was also quoted in the Compendium of Materia Medica or Bencao Gangmu (1596) under its entry for Tiyu 

The Bencao Gangmu categorized the tiyu as one of two types of "human-fish" (renyu). The human-fish were also known as "child-fish" or haieryu.

The other type, called the niyu is elaborated in a separate section. It has been noted by Li Shizhen that the character for the Niyu (Ni  fish) consists of the "fish" indexing component and "child" radical.

Translators of the Bencao Gangmu attempt to match entries with actual taxa of animals, forbs, etc., where possible, and the tiyu type is glossed as "newts" while the niyu type is "Chinese giant salamander".

Chiru or red ru fish 

The  ("red ru fish". Wade-Giles: ch'ih-ju; "red ju") is described in the Nan Shan Jing ("Classic of the Southern Mountains") as a human-headed fish. It is said to be found in the Qingqushan ( "Green-Hills Mountains") in the Pool-of-Yi (Yì zhī zé ; "Carp-Wings Lake"). It is described as basically fish-form but having a human face, and issuing sounds like the mandarin duck. Eating it purportedly prevented scabies or itchy skin.

Jiaoren 
The jiaoren ( "flood dragon people" or  "shark people") that appear in medieval writings are considered to be references to merfolk.

This mythical southern mermaid or merman is recorded in 's  "Records of Strange Things" (early 6th century CE).

In the midst of the South Sea are the houses of the kău people who dwell in the water like fish, but have not given up weaving at the loom. Their eyes have the power to weep, but what they bring forth is pearls.

Similar passages appear in other texts such as the Bowuzhi ("Treatise of Manifold " ) as "weep[ing] tears that became pearls".

These aquatic people supposedly spun a type of raw silk called jiaoxiao  "mermaid silk" or jiaonujuan  "mermaid woman's silk". Schafer equates this with sea silk, the rare fabric woven from byssus filaments produced by Pinna "pen shell" mollusks.

Japan 

The ningyo ( "human-fish") of Japan has its own history in the country's literary record. The earliest references (in the Nihon shoki, entry for year 619, reign of Empress Suiko) do not specifically use the term ningyo, and the "thing" appeared in fresh water (a river in Ōmi Province, canal Settsu Province), and may presumed to be a giant salamander. Later accounts claim that Empress Suiko's regent Prince Shōtoku knew the creature to be a ningyo when one was presented to him by representatives of Ōmi.  The appearance of the human-fish was strongly associated with ill omen in later treatments of the Prince's encounter with the human-fish.

During the Kamakura Period, ningyo of the marine sort were frequently reported as washing ashore, and these were taken to be ominous signs usually prefiguring bloody battles.

The ningyo, or rather renyu and the like found in Chinese sources (chiru, tiyu etc., etc., discussed above) were also discussed in Japanese literature, for example, works of scholars of herbal and traditional medicine, such as Kaibara Ekiken (d. 1714) and Ono Ranzan (d. 1810), who also aware of European discussions on "sirens", "anthropomorphic fish", "peixe muller (fish-woman)", etc.

In popular culture
 Merfolk are a fictional race of humanoids that live underwater in Dungeons & Dragons.
 Merfolk are humanoid aquatic creatures with fish-like characteristics in Magic: The Gathering.
 Merfolk are humanoid aquatic creatures with fish-like characteristics in Spectromancer.
 In One Piece, the Merfolk are among the different races in the anime and one of the two types that dwell underwater (the other being the Fishmen). Each of the Merfolk has their "fish" parts based on different fishes and related creatures like coelacanths, icefish, kissing gouramis, Japanese rice fish, striped beakfish, righteye flounders, olive flounders, blue-striped angelfish, smelt-whitings, sharks, oarfish, opahs, blue-ringed octopuses, shortfin mako sharks, seahorses, catfish, Bering wolffish, goldfish, and brotulas.

See also

 Mer (disambiguation)
 Naiad, female spirits of Greek mythology 
 Nixie, water spirits of Germanic (especially Scandinavian) folklore
 Piscine humanoid
 Rusalka, female spirits of Slavic folklore

Explanatory notes

References
Citations

Bibliography

 

 

 

 
 

 
 
 
 
 

 

 

 

 

 

 
Mythological human hybrids
Mythological aquatic creatures
Fairy tale stock characters